Nicola Peccheneda (1725, Polla – 4 November 1804) was an Italian painter of Campania and Basilicata in the second half of the 18th century. He initially trained in Naples, likely in the studio of Francesco de Mura. He adopted the reigning style of Francesco Solimena. While he came from a family including professionals (brother was a lawyer and judge in Naples); he moved back to his native Polla, and despite painting in the region, lived until he died.

Works
A work from 1756 depicting San Donato da Ripacandida was destined to the convent of San Francisco of Auletta. He decorated of the churches of Santa Maria of the Greeks and Santa Caterina in Caggiano, and the church of Santa Maria Maggiore in Sant' Arsenio, the Cathedral of Melfi, the church of the Annunziata in Marcianise. He was prolific and his paintings can be found in Altavilla Silentina, Atena Lucana, Buccino, Giffoni Valle Piana, Padula, Petina, Polla, Romagnano al Monte, Sassano, Teggiano and Vibonati in Campania, as well as Brienza, Brindisi Montagna, Cirigliano, Maratea, and Marsico Nuovo in Basilicata. He was elected mayor of Polla.

References

Painting in Santa Caterina di Caggiano
informarte.org/

External links

1725 births
1804 deaths
People from the Province of Salerno
18th-century Italian painters
Italian male painters
19th-century Italian painters
Painters from Naples
Rococo painters
19th-century Italian male artists
18th-century Italian male artists